Broome County Courthouse is a historic courthouse located at Binghamton in Broome County, New York. It is a massive -story structure, built on a raised foundation, in the form of a Latin Cross and topped with an elegant copper dome.  Originally constructed in 1897–1898 in a "T" shape, the south wing was added in 1916-1917 to form the cross.  It was designed by noted New York State architect Isaac G. Perry. The courthouse is located within the boundaries of the Court Street Historic District.

It was listed on the National Register of Historic Places in 1973.

References

External links

Broome County, New York

County courthouses in New York (state)
Buildings and structures in Binghamton, New York
History of Broome County, New York
National Register of Historic Places in Broome County, New York
Courthouses on the National Register of Historic Places in New York (state)
Historic American Buildings Survey in New York (state)
Government buildings completed in 1898
Clock towers in New York (state)